John Arundell (by 1527 – 17 November 1590), of Lanherne, St. Mawgan-in-Pyder, Cornwall, was an English politician. He was a noted recusant, and a close associate of the Catholic martyr St. Cuthbert Mayne.

Biography 
He was the eldest son of John Arundell (died 1557) and Elizabeth Dannett, daughter of Sir Gerald Dannett of Dannett's Hall, Leicestershire. The Arundells were a wealthy and influential family with close connections to the Tudor dynasty. The head of the senior (Lanherne) branch of the family was often described as "the most important man in the county". The elder John's younger brother Thomas was also a political figure of some eminence, who fell out of  Royal favour and was executed for treason in 1552. John was imprisoned but never brought to trial. Under the Catholic Queen Mary I, the surviving Arundells, who were staunch Catholics, regained much of their influence in Cornwall.

John Arundell married, in 1557, Lady Ann Stanley, widow of Charles Stourton, 8th Baron Stourton, and daughter of Edward Stanley, 3rd Earl of Derby and Lady Dorothy Howard. They had three  children:
 John Arundell (1564–1633), who married Ann Jerningham, daughter of Henry Jerningham
 George Arundell, who married Dorothy Viell
 Thomas Arundell

Arundell was a Member of the Parliament of England for Helston in 1545, Shaftesbury in 1547, Preston in 1555 and Cornwall in 1558.

Recusant 

Like his father, and many other members of the Arundell family, he was an open Roman Catholic. He refused to subscribe to the Act of Uniformity 1559 and rarely attended Anglican services (despite the legal obligation to do so at least once a week, on pain of a fine). He was a close associate of the martyr Cuthbert Mayne, and paid for the education of another Catholic martyr, John Cornelius, later to be the family chaplain. Because of his standing in the community, he was left in peace until 1577, when his association with Cuthbert Mayne became public knowledge. He was arrested and spent some years in the Tower of London, and was later imprisoned in Ely Palace, from which he was released shortly before his death: he was also heavily fined by the Star Chamber.

His widow continued to engage in openly recusant activities. John Cornelius served as her private chaplain, even though harbouring a Catholic priest had been made a capital offence by the Jesuits, etc. Act 1584. Cornelius was tried and executed under the same Act in 1594, but Lady Arundell was apparently left in peace. She died in 1602.

Ancestry

References

1590 deaths
People from St Mawgan
Members of the Parliament of England for Helston
English MPs 1545–1547
English MPs 1547–1552
English MPs 1555
English MPs 1558
John (1527)
Year of birth uncertain
Members of the Parliament of England (pre-1707) for Cornwall